The 30th Luna Awards were held on August 26, 2012 at the Quezon City Sports Club and they honored the best Filipino films of the year 2011.

The list of nominations were released on August 3, 2012. Thelma received the most nominations with nine. Manila Kingpin: The Asiong Salonga Story followed with eight.

Both Manila Kingpin: The Asiong Salonga Story and Thelma dominated the ceremony. The former garnered six awards, including the Best Picture while the latter won four awards.

Winners and nominees

Note:

 Tikoy Aguiluz refused to take directorial credit after the producers re-shot, re-edited and re-scored the film without his knowledge and consent.

Special awards

Multiple nominations and awards

References

External links
 Official Website of the Film Academy of the Philippines

Luna Awards
2012 in Philippine cinema
2012 film awards